Campouriez is a commune in the Aveyron department of southern France.  It is part of the former province of Rouergue, which utilised the Rouergat dialect of Languedocien Occitan.  Inhabitants of Campouriez are called Campouriézois.

Geography
The territory of this commune takes up a portion of the central-southern area of the Massif Central, on the Viadène plateau and near the gorge of the Truyère and the valley of the Lot.  The village is located on a hilltop, and is surrounded by the hamlets la Vaysse, la Joanie, le Bruel, Nigole, Banhars and especially Bez-Bédène.

History
The name Campouriez comes from "champ d'or," Occitan for "field of gold."

Population

See also
Communes of the Aveyron department

References

Communes of Aveyron
Aveyron communes articles needing translation from French Wikipedia